The 1996 All-Ireland Senior Club Camogie Championship for the leading clubs in the women's team field sport of camogie was won by Pearses from the Ballymacward and Gurteen areas of Co Galway, who defeated Granagh-Ballingarry from Limerick in the final, played at Glen Rovers.

Arrangements
The championship was organised on the traditional provincial system used in Gaelic Games since the 1880s, with Rathnure and Leitrim Fontenoys winning the championships of the other two provinces. The 14-year-old Eileen O'Brien, who had won All-Ireland Colleges senior and sevens medals earlier in the season, scored 11 points for Granagh-Ballingarry in the semi-final against Leitrim Fontenoys of Down.

The Final
In the final, Eileen O'Brien, was restricted to two points by Aisling Ward while Maureen Sheehan confined Sharon Glynn to four scores.

Final stages

References

External links
 Camogie Association

1996 in camogie
1996